Mount Gambier railway station was the junction station for the Naracoorte–Millicent and Mount Gambier-Heywood lines in the South Australian city of Mount Gambier. It was last used in 2006, and has since been transformed into a public community space.

History
In 1879, a narrow  gauge line opened from Beachport (Rivoli Bay North) through Millicent to Mount Gambier. In 1887, the Mount Gambier railway line was constructed to Naracoorte (connecting to the Kingston-Naracoorte railway line) and Wolseley, where it joined the Adelaide-Wolseley line.

On 28 November 1917, a broad gauge line opened from Mount Gambier to Heywood near Portland. In the 1950s, the narrow gauge lines were converted to broad gauge.

Mount Gambier had an extensive goods yard and a locomotive depot with a roundhouse.

Following the gauge conversion of the Adelaide-Wolseley and Portland lines to standard gauge in 1995, the lines closed. There are regular calls for the line to be reopened.

In the late 1990s to mid 2000s, the Limestone Coast Railway, operated tourist services on the abandoned lines from Mount Gambier to Penola, Coonawarra, Tantanoola, Millicent and Rennick with Redhen railcars. However, due to increased insurance costs, the service ceased 1 July 2006, with the last service being a train to Tantanoola on 28 June 2006.

In 2013, the old yard was lifted and covered with grass. The station building was then operated by radio station Lime FM.

In 2015, after over a year of work, the Railway Lands was completely transformed into a public community space. 20,000 square metres of turn covered the entire former-industrial site. The grand opening in November saw thousands of residents come together to utilise the area. A "back to nature" playground, wheelchair-accessible barbecues, a pond with a creek, native plants, a labyrinth, plus many more features for the community to use. 
Mount Gambier City Council plan to use the area for a number of annual events, but encourage local community groups to also activate the area. This, in turn, permanently disconnects the Heywood line from the Millicent and Naracoorte lines except for a two track easement through to give right of way for any future standardisation.

In 2018, the roundhouse was demolished after being damaged by fire in 2014. Timber from the roundhouse was reused at a different roundhouse in Peterborough during its restoration from 2021 to 2022.

In 2020, the station building was restored to original condition by the City of Mount Gambier Council.

Services
Mount Gambier station was served from Adelaide by an overnight mixed train until October 1985 and then by a service  using Bluebird railcars until December 1990. Today, Mount Gambier is connected to the Victorian rail service via a V/Line coach service to and from Warrnambool.

See also
 Rail transport in South Australia
 Rail transport in Victoria

References

External links
Mount Gambier marshalling yards Johnny's Pages

Disused railway stations in South Australia
Railway stations closed in 1995
Parks in South Australia
Limestone Coast
Mount Gambier, South Australia